Alec Andon, professionally known as Alec Monopoly, is a street artist originally from New York City. His signature is covering his face with his hand or using a medical face mask to hide his facial identity. His claim to fame is the use of the Parker Brothers legendary board game Monopoly character "Mr. Monopoly" (today part of the Hasbro brand). The artist has also worked in the urban environments of Miami, Los Angeles, Europe, Mexico, and throughout Asia using varied materials (including stencils, spray paint, epoxies, varnishes, and newspapers) to depict various iconic pop culture characters. He also is a brand ambassador with Swiss watchmaker TAG Heuer and created a mural live, on red carpet for the 2013 film, Justin Bieber's Believe. Monopoly's work has been purchased by such notable people as Philipp Plein, Miley Cyrus, Robin Thicke, Snoop Dogg, Seth Rogen, Adrien Brody, and Iggy Azalea, among others.

Life and work
Alec Monopoly grew up in New York and moved to Los Angeles in 2006. He found working there was easier because of the many billboards in the city, and because of the more exclusive nature of New York City's art scene.

Monopoly is best known for his tuxedoed and top-hatted graffiti characterization of Monopoly Man, an idea originally inspired by the stockbroker Bernie Madoff. According to John Wellington Ennis writing for the Huffington Post, "In an era of billion dollar bailouts for banks that already own the country and moguls decrying regulation as un-American, the re-contextualization of the childhood symbol of success and wealth almost needed no explanation." Monopoly also pastes up images of Jack Nicholson.

In November 2010 he had his first solo gallery show in New York City. In December 2010, he took part in an exhibition at the Mondrian Hotel as part of Art Basel Miami Beach. In 2013, he hosted a yacht party at Art Basel Miami Beach, sponsored by Samsung. In 2021, Monopoly collaborated with the media company Barstool Sports to sell exclusive merchandise in an effort to raise money for the Barstool Fund which is raising money for small businesses as a part of a COVID-19 relief effort.

Filmography
Pay 2 Play: Democracy's High Stakes, 2014 documentary film

References

External links
 

1980s births
Living people
Artists from New York (state)
American graffiti artists
Pseudonymous artists
American DJs